The S11 is a commuter rail route forming part of the Milan suburban railway service, which converges on the city of Milan, Italy.

The route runs over the infrastructure of the Milan–Chiasso railway.  Like all but one of the other Milan suburban railway service routes, it is operated by Trenord.

Route 

  Chiasso ↔ Como San Giovanni ↔ Milano Porta Garibaldi ↔ Rho

Line S11, a radial route, heads initially in an southeasterly direction from Chiasso in Switzerland over the border to Como San Giovanni, and then south, to Camnago-Lentate.  From there, it turns southeast towards Monza, and finally southwest, to Milano Porta Garibaldi. From 26 April 2015, has been extended to the station of Rho due to the start of Expo 2015 on 1 May 2015.

History
The route was activated on 14 December 2008, and was initially an hourly regional rail service between its two termini, although it was designated at Chiasso station as the S11.

On 13 December 2009, the Italian part of the route was reclassified as the S11 suburban rail line.

On 26 April 2015, has been extended to Rho.

Stations 
The stations on the S11 are as follows (the stations with a coloured background are within the municipality of Milan):

Scheduling 
, S11 trains ran hourly between 05:16 and 24:00 Monday to Saturday, with additional services during rush hour in the mornings and evenings.

See also 

 History of rail transport in Italy
 List of Milan suburban railway stations
 Rail transport in Italy
 Transport in Milan

References

External links
 ATM – official site 
 Trenord – official site 
 Schematic of Line S11 – schematic depicting all stations on Line S11

This article is based upon a translation of the Italian language version as at November 2012.

Milan S Lines